Gianluca Iacono (born 14 March 1970 in Turin) is an Italian voice actor who contributes to voicing characters in movies, cartoons, anime and more content. Iacono is well known for voicing Vegeta in the Italian version of Dragon Ball Z and Dragon Ball GT, Genghis in The Wacky World of Tex Avery and Roy Mustang in Fullmetal Alchemist. Between 2010 and 2011, he temporarily replaced Claudio Moneta as the voice of Kakashi Hatake in Naruto: Shippuden.

Iacono currently works at Deneb Film, Studio P.V., Merak Film, Studio ASCI and other dubbing studios in Italy.

Voice work

Animation
 Vegeta in Dragon Ball Z, Dragon Ball GT and Dragon Ball Super
 Donbe in Dr. Slump (second dub, 1980/86 series) 
 Genghis in The Wacky World of Tex Avery
 Mizuki in Naruto
 Kakashi Hatake (2nd voice) in Naruto: Shippuden
 Scoutmaster Lumpus in Camp Lazlo
 Gonard in Kappa Mikey
 Elias Van Dahl in W.I.T.C.H.
 Reed Richards/Mr. Fantastic in Fantastic Four: World's Greatest Heroes
 Bane in The New Batman Adventures
 Firefly in The Batman Green Arrow in Batman: The Brave and the Bold Mason Brown in Bakugan: Gundalian Invaders R Grey in Sgt. Frog Prowl in Transformers Animated Lance Alvers in X-Men: Evolution Ryuji Otogi in Yu-Gi-Oh!
 Adrian Gecko, Slade Princeton, and other characters in Yu-Gi-Oh! GX Lenny and Zigzix in Yu-Gi-Oh! 5D's Viscount Lerajie in Chrono Crusade Tomoka in Shin Hakkenden Igneous in Spider Riders Langston Lickatoadin Viva Piñata Masahiro Hamasaki in Mermaid Melody Pichi Pichi Pitch Shunsuke in Tokyo Mew Mew Garuda Aiacos in Saint Seiya Kaien Cross in Vampire Knight Tres Iqus in Trinity Blood Baptistin in Gankutsuou: The Count of Monte Cristo Otaki Aoyama in Ah! My Goddess: The Movie Go in Prétear Shun Tojo in Corrector Yui Roy Mustang in Fullmetal Alchemist and Fullmetal Alchemist: Brotherhood Ord in Dragon Tales Ryu in Shaman King Kyuzo in Samurai 7 Take and Nakamaru in Saishu Heiki Kanojo Chip Oblong in The Oblongs Leo Trench in Odd Job Jack Harry/Stormy Weathers in Scooby-Doo! and the Legend of the Vampire Haohmaru in Samurai Shodown: The Motion Picture Rhesus 2 in Captain Simian & the Space Monkeys Dracula in ChalkZoneLive action
 Marshall Eriksen in How I Met Your Mother Dr. Merrill Bobolit and Brendan McNamara in Nip/Tuck Hector Lopez in Becker Neville Watson in Where I Live Vince D'Amata in Hang Time Joe Wylee in Flash Gordon Dozer in Angela's Eyes Angus in The Mystic Knights of Tir Na Nog Elliot Sacks in This Is Wonderland Nick Biancavilla in Strong Medicine Beowulf in Beowulf & Grendel Undercover Brother/Anton Jackson in Undercover Brother Álex in REC Detective Cho Yong-koo in Memories of Murder Soz in Dead Man's Shoes''

References

External links
 

Living people
Actors from Turin
Italian male voice actors
Italian male video game actors
1970 births